Lutheran Hill is an unincorporated community in the towns of Dane and Roxbury, Dane County, Wisconsin, United States.

Notes

Unincorporated communities in Dane County, Wisconsin
Unincorporated communities in Wisconsin